Changfeng may refer to:

Changfeng Automobile (长丰), automobile company of mainland China
Changfeng (missile) (长风), developed by the People's Republic of China

Locations in China 
Changfeng, Renqiu (长丰镇), in Hebei
Changfeng, Hainan (长丰镇), in Wanning City
Changfeng County (长丰县), Hefei, Anhui
Changfeng Park (长风公园), in Shanghai
Changfeng Subdistrict, Shijiazhuang (长丰街道), in Chang'an District, Shijiazhuang, Hebei
Changfeng Subdistrict, Qiaokou District (长丰街道), Wuhan, Hubei
Changfeng Township, Anhui (长风乡), in Yingjiang District, Anqing
Changfeng Township, Guizhou (长丰乡), in Dejiang County
Changfeng Township, Jiangxi (长丰乡), in Luxi County

See also
Chang Feng (born 1923), Taiwanese actor